The Hanseatic Cross (Hanseatenkreuz) was a decoration of the three Hanseatic city-states of Bremen, Hamburg and Lübeck, who were members of the German Empire during World War I. Each republic established its own version of the cross, but the design and award criteria were similar for each. The cross was awarded for merit in war, and could be awarded to civilians as well as military personnel.  When awarded for bravery or combat merit, it was the three cities' equivalent of the Prussian Iron Cross.

Recipients
There were approximately 50,000 awards of the Hanseatic Cross of Hamburg, the largest Hanseatic city. The Bremen Hanseatic Cross was awarded approximately 20,000 times. Lübeck was the smallest of the Hanseatic cities, and its Hanseatic Cross was awarded approximately 8-10,000 times.

Triple holders
Eduard von Capelle – admiral and State Secretary of the Imperial Naval Office
Franz von Hipper – admiral and commander of the High Seas Fleet
Prince Leopold of Bavaria
Felix von Luckner – corvette captain and commerce raider
Karl August Nerger – captain at sea and commerce raider
Rupprecht, Crown Prince of Bavaria
Otto von Stülpnagel – general of infantry in World War II
Wilhelm II, German Emperor

Two-time holders
Ludwig Beck – (Hamburg and Bremen), colonel general in World War II
Fedor von Bock – (Hamburg and Bremen), general field  marshal in World War II
Felix Graf von Bothmer – (Bremen and Lübeck), colonel general
Theodor Endres – (Hamburg and Lübeck), General of Artillery in World War II
Nikolaus von Falkenhorst – (Hamburg and Bremen), colonel general in World War II
Wilhelm Heye – (Hamburg and Lübeck), colonel general and head of the Army Command
Henning von Holtzendorff – (Hamburg and Bremen), grand admiral and chief of the Imperial Admiralty Staff
Hans Howaldt – (Hamburg and Lübeck), captain at Sea and submarine commander
Leonhard Kaupisch – (Hamburg and Bremen), General of Aviators in World War II
Wilhelm Keitel – (Hamburg and Bremen), general field marshal in World War II
Friedrich Koch – (Hamburg and Bremen), general of infantry in World War II
Wilhelm Ritter von Leeb – (Hamburg and Bremen), General Field Marshal in World War II
Hermann Meyer-Rabingen – (Hamburg and Bremen), lieutenant general in World War II
Walther Reinhardt – (Hamburg and Bremen),  major general, head of the Army Command and Prussian Minister of War
Manfred von Richthofen – (Bremen and Lübeck), captain and fighter ace
Helmuth von Ruckteschell – (Hamburg and Bremen), captain at sea and commerce raider
Hans-Jürgen Stumpff – (Hamburg and Lübeck), Colonel General in World War II

Unknown version
Hans Reese

Hamburg
Günther Angern – Lieutenant General in World War II
Wilhelm von Apell – Lieutenant General in World War II
Lothar von Arnauld de la Perière, vice admiral
Hans-Jürgen von Arnim – colonel general in World War II
Walter Assmann – Lieutenant General in World War II
Paul Bader – General of Artillery in World War II
Curt Badinski – Lieutenant General in World War II
Hermann Bauer – Admiral and commander of Submarines
Hans Behlendorff – General of Artillery in World War II
Hans-Georg Benthack – major general in World War II
Hans Berr – first lieutenant and fighter ace
Helmuth Beukemann – Lieutenant General in World War II
Erich Bey – rear admiral in World War II
Bruno Bieler – General of Infantry in World War II
Georg von Bismarck – Lieutenant General in World War II
Fedor von Bock – General Field Marshal in World War II
Walter von Boltenstern – Lieutenant General in World War II
Hermann Breith – General of Armored Troops in World War II
Wilhelm Burgdorf – General of Infantry in World War II
Carl Casper – Lieutenant General in World War II
Wolfgang von Chamier-Glisczinski – Lieutenant General in World War II
Friedrich Christiansen – captain at Sea and naval fighter ace, General of Aviators in World War II
Erich-Heinrich Clößner – General of Infantry in World War II
Ludwig Crüwell – General of Armored Troops in World War II
Karl Decker – General of Armored Troops in World War II
Paul Deichmann – General of Aviators in World War II
Paul Drekmann – lieutenant general in World War II
Kurt Eberhard – Major General and SS-Brigadeführer in World War II
Johann-Heinrich Eckhardt – Lieutenant General in World War II
Alexander von Falkenhausen – General of Infantry in World War II
Wilhelm Falley – Lieutenant General in World War II
Gustav Fehn – General of Armored Troops in World War II
Paul Fenn – captain at Sea in World War II
Edgar Feuchtinger – Lieutenant General in World War II
Wolfgang Fischer – General of Armored Troops in World War II
Hermann Flörke – Lieutenant General in World War II
Otto-Wilhelm Förster – General of Engineers in World War II
Walther Forstmann – submarine commander during World War II
James Franck – First Lieutenant and physicist
Bruno Frankewitz – Lieutenant General in World War II
Wilhelm Frankl – Lieutenant and fighter ace
Maximilian Fretter-Pico – General of Artillery in World War II
Kurt Fricke – Admiral in World War II
Werner von Fritsch – Colonel General in World War II
Friedrich Fromm – Colonel General in World War II
Hans Freiherr von Funck – General of Armored Troops in World War II
Curt Gallenkamp – General of Artillery in World War II
Hermann Geyer – General of Infantry in World War II
Werner von Gilsa – General of Infantry in World War II
Karl von Graffen – Lieutenant General in World War II
Horst Großmann – General of Infantry in World War II
Curt Haase – Colonel General in World War II
Siegfried Haenicke – General of Infantry in World War II
Hermann von Hanneken – General of Infantry in World War II
Erick-Oskar Hansen – General of Cavalry in World War II
Paul von Hase – Lieutenant General in World War II
Wilhelm Hasse – General of Infantry in World War II
Arthur Hauffe – General of Infantry in World War II
Gotthard Heinrici – Colonel General in World War II
Walter Heitz – Colonel General in World War II
Otto Herfurth – major general in World War II
Friedrich Herrlein – General of Infantry in World War II
Kurt Herzog – General of Artillery in World War II
Gustav Höhne – General of Infantry in World War II
Rudolf Holste – Lieutenant General in World War II
Friedrich Hoßbach – General of Infantry in World War II
Hermann Hoth – Colonel General in World War II
Helmuth Huffmann – Lieutenant General in World War II
Max Immelmann – First Lieutenant and fighter ace
Hans Jordan – General of Infantry in World War II
Gerhard Kauffmann – Lieutenant General in World War II
Georg Keppler – SS-Obergruppenführer in World War II
Paul Ludwig Ewald von Kleist – General Field Marshal in World War II
Carl-Erik Koehler – General of Cavalry in World War II
Waldemar Kophamel – submarine commander
Heinrich Krampf – Lieutenant General in World War II
Hans Kreysing – General of Mountain Troops in World War II
Georg von Küchler – General Field Marshal in World War II
Friedrich Kühn – General of Armored Troops in World War II
Walter Kuntze – General of Engineers in World War II
Werner Lange – vice admiral in World War II
Hans Langsdorff – captain at Sea and commerce raider in World War II
Hans Leistikow – Major General in World War II
Joachim Lemelsen – General of Armored Troops in World War II
Theo-Helmut Lieb – Lieutenant General in World War II
Fritz Lindemann – General of Artillery in World War II
Max Lindig – Lieutenant General in World War II
Walther Lucht – General of Artillery in World War II
Günther Lütjens – admiral in World War II
Oswald Lutz – General of Armored Troops in World War II
Friedrich Lützow – Vice Admiral in World War II
Erich von Manstein – General Field Marshal in World War II
Erich Marcks – General of Artillery in World War II
Gerhard Matzky – General of Infantry in World War II, lieutenant general in the Bundeswehr
Wilhelm Meisel – admiral in World War II
Georg Alexander von Müller – Admiral and Chief of the Imperial Naval Cabinet
Hermann Niehoff – General of Infantry in World War II
Erich Petersen – General of Aviators in World War II
Heinz Piekenbrock – Lieutenant General in World War II
Adolf Raegener – Lieutenant General in World War II
Heino von Rantzau – Lieutenant General in World War II
Walther von Reichenau – General Field Marshal in World War II
Hermann Reinecke – General of Infantry in World War II
Ludwig von Reuter – Admiral and commander of the High Seas Fleet
Lothar von Richthofen – first lieutenant and fighter ace
Kurt Röpke – General of Infantry in World War II
Günther Rüdel – Colonel General in World War II
Alfred Saalwächter – General Admiral in World War II
Ferdinand Schaal – General of Armored Troops in World War II
Hans Schmidt – General of Infantry in World War II
Kurt Schmidt – lieutenant general in World War II
Otto von Schrader – Admiral in World War II
Walther Schroth – General of Infantry in World War II
Hans von Seeckt – colonel general and head of the Army Command
Walther von Seydlitz-Kurzbach – General of Artillery in World War II
Hermann Ritter von Speck – General of Artillery in World War II
Hans Stohwasser – Vice Admiral in World War II
Peter Strasser – Frigate Captain and commander of Naval Zeppelins
Ernst Thälmann – Gunner in the imperial German Artillery, later leader of the Communist Party of Germany and the Roter Frontkämpferbund
August Thiele – Vice Admiral in World War II
Joachim von Tresckow – Lieutenant General in World War II
Horst Julius Freiherr Treusch von Buttlar-Brandenfels – colonel in World War II
Walter von Unruh – General of Infantry in World War II
Walter Warzecha – General Admiral and Commander-in-Chief of the Kriegsmarine in World War II
Paul Fritz Wiemann – NSDAP official in World War II
Erwin von Witzleben – General Field Marshal in World War II
Albert Wodrig – General of Artillery in World War II
Eberhard Wolfram – Vice Admiral in World War II
Rudolf Zürn – Colonel in World War II

Bremen
Prince Adalbert of Prussia
Conrad Albrecht – general admiral in World War II
Harald Auffarth – lieutenant colonel and fighter ace
Werner von Blomberg – General Field Marshal in World War II
Fritz von Lossberg – General of Infantry
Erich Lüdke – General of Infantry in World War II
Georg Meyer – second lieutenant and fighter ace
Hans Rose – submarine commander
Adolf Strauss – Colonel General in World War II

Lübeck

Paul Behncke – admiral and State Secretary of the Imperial Naval Office
Karl von Bülow – General Field Marshal
Kurt Dittmar – lieutenant general in World War II
Waldemar Erfurth – General of Infantry in World War II
Hans Feige – General of Infantry in World War II
Hermann Frommherz – major general and fighter ace
Eberhard Godt – Admiral in World War II
Kurt von Hammerstein-Equord – colonel general in World War II
Ulrich Kessler – General of Aviators in World War II
Gustav Kieseritzky – vice admiral in World War II
Ewald von Lochow – General of Infantry
Curt von Morgen – General of Infantry
Heinrich von Vietinghoff – Colonel General in World War II
 Leopold Zmajević – Austrian Sea Captain

See also
Hanseatic Cross
Orders, decorations, and medals of Imperial Germany

Recipients of the Hanseatic Cross